Norden  (East Frisian Low Saxon: Nörden) is a town in the district of Aurich, in Lower Saxony, Germany. It is situated near the North Sea shore, in East Frisia.

Town and land use 

Norden consists of the town itself and ten official subdistricts. In addition to the old town centre, the main town includes the former municipality of Sandbauerschaft and the subdistricts Ekel, Lintel and Westgaste. They are divided into various quarters and residential areas such as Neustadt, Westlintel, Ostlintel, Ekelergaste, In der Wirde, Vierzig Diemat, Martensdorf, or "millionaire quarter". They have in common that they do not have any administrative function, but are places referred to in everyday local language.

The other subdistricts are Bargebur, Leybuchtpolder, Norddeich (which bore the name Lintelermarsch until 1972), Westermarsch I, Westermarsch II, Southderneuland I, Southderneuland II and Tidofeld.

The main town and the villages of Bargebur, Norddeich, Süderneneuland I and Süderneuland II, as well as parts of Westermarsch II, have largely grown together, and with the exception of Norddeich and Westermarsch II, form extensive residential and commercial areas in the south and east of the borough. About 92.5% of the total urban population live in this "metropolitan area". The remaining subdistricts continue to be very rural and mostly sparsely populated, but they occupy by far the largest share of the total area of the borough.

Cemeteries

Notable people

 Hermann Conring (1606–1681), German physician and politician
 Johann Cramer (1905–1987), German politician (SPD), member of the German Bundestag
 Wilhelm von Freeden (1822–1894), German mathematician, scientist and oceanographer and founder of the North German Naval Observatory
 Recha Freier (1892–1984), writer, winner of the Israeli State Prize
 Wilhelm Gnapheus (1493–1568), a humanist and Reformed Protestant scholar
 Otto Ites (1918–1982), Rear Admiral of the Federal Navy, support the Knight's Cross of the Iron Cross and the Federal Order of Merit
 Jann-Peter Janssen (1945-2022), politician
 Marco Kutscher (born 1975), show jumping
 Herbert Müller (born 1953), painter
 Johann Schröder (1925–2007), German mathematician
 Heiko Schwartz (1911–1973), water polo player
 Barbara Schlag (born 1951), teacher, mayor of Norden from 1998 to 2016

Emigrants
 Pieter Claesen Wyckoff

See also
Norddeich
Norden also hosts the launch point of the world's longest submarine cable, SEA-ME-WE 3
St. Ludgeri church houses the famous organ (1686/92) by organ builder Arp Schnitger
Norden was the seat of Dornkaat distillers (est. 1806), producer a.o. of the nationwide known brand Dornkaat, a triple distilled korn. The vast production area is kept under monument law, partially a museum, but mostly with new companies in the old buildings.

References

External links

 Official site 
 Norddeich, a District of Norden 

Towns and villages in East Frisia
Port cities and towns of the North Sea
Port cities and towns in Germany
Aurich (district)
Populated coastal places in Germany (North Sea)
Appeared in the novel by Erskin Childers, and the film, Riddle of the Sands. WW1 fictional historic novel.